Gothic Mountain is a prominent mountain summit in the Elk Mountains range of the Rocky Mountains of North America. Gothic Mountain takes its name from its pinnacles said to resemble Gothic architecture.

See also

List of Colorado mountain ranges
List of Colorado mountain summits
List of Colorado fourteeners
List of Colorado 4000 meter prominent summits
List of the most prominent summits of Colorado
List of Colorado county high points

References

External links

Mountains of Colorado
Mountains of Gunnison County, Colorado
Gunnison National Forest
North American 3000 m summits